Lynne Tasker (born 27 August 1963) is a Zimbabwean breaststroke and freestyle swimmer. She competed in three events at the 1980 Summer Olympics.

References

External links
 

1963 births
Living people
Zimbabwean female breaststroke swimmers
Zimbabwean female freestyle swimmers
Olympic swimmers of Zimbabwe
Swimmers at the 1980 Summer Olympics
Commonwealth Games competitors for Zimbabwe
Swimmers at the 1982 Commonwealth Games
Place of birth missing (living people)